The 2014 ABC Supply Wisconsin 250 was the sixteenth round of the 2014 IndyCar Series season, held at The Milwaukee Mile. Will Power dominated and won the race, leading 229 of 250 laps.

References

ABC Supply Wisconsin 250
Milwaukee Indy 225
ABC Supply Wisconsin 250